John Connor is a fictional character in the Terminator franchise. Created by writer and director James Cameron, the character is first referred to in the 1984 film The Terminator and first appears in its 1991 sequel Terminator 2: Judgment Day (T2). In the character's first appearance, John is portrayed by Edward Furlong as a child, and briefly by Michael Edwards as an adult in a small role. Other actors have portrayed the character in subsequent films, including Nick Stahl, Christian Bale, and Jason Clarke (as the T-3000). In addition, Thomas Dekker portrayed John Connor in the television series Terminator: The Sarah Connor Chronicles.  The character serves as a key protagonist in Terminator 2: Judgment Day (1991) , Terminator 3: Rise of the Machines (2003), Terminator Salvation (2009) and as a minor protagonist in Terminator: Dark Fate (2019), where in alternate timeline set after the events of the second film a young John is assassinated by a T-800 in 1998 before reaching adulthood in that  films' opening prologue scene with Dani Ramos taking his place in that timeline as the future leader of the resistance. Connor serves as the antagonist of the film Terminator Genisys (2015) where in another alternate timeline Skynet manages to successfully turn John into a T-3000 Terminator - a Terminator created by infecting human subjects with nanites resulting of the conversion of human flesh into machine phase matter.

Creation 
In a 2021 interview, James Cameron said that the song "Russians" by Sting inspired him to create John Connor: "I remember sitting there once, high on E, writing notes for Terminator, and I was struck by Sting’s song, that “I hope the Russians love their children too.” And I thought, “You know what? The idea of a nuclear war is just so antithetical to life itself.” That’s where the kid came from."

Terminator film series

John Connor's age

Over the years, there have been multiple discrepancies, discussions and confusion over the age of John Connor.

In Terminator 2: Judgment Day, the police computer the T-1000 uses lists John's date of birth as February 28, 1985, consistent with his conception in The Terminator, taking place in May 1984, making him a 10-year-old in T2. However, this is contradicted in T2 when the reprogrammed Terminator tells John he will send it back through time "35 years from now". This would mean the movie is set in 1994 when John is a 9-year-old. Later on it also states that Judgment Day will happen "in three years time", in August 1997. However, the Terminator may have been rounding up.

In the opening narration of Terminator 3: Rise of the Machines, John states that he was attacked by the T-1000 when he was thirteen. Furthermore, he tells the T-101 that Cyberdyne was destroyed "over 10 years ago", which would make him several years older than what was previously established in the earlier films. This was a mistake made by T3'''s director, who chose to make the character older to match Edward Furlong's age in T2. The synopsis on several T3 DVD covers also incorrectly state that John is 22.

In the pilot episode of Terminator: The Sarah Connor Chronicles, taking place in August 1999, John is fifteen, stating it has been 2 years since they blew up Cyberdyne (T2 taking place in 1997 in the show, rather than 1995). After time traveling to 2007 with Sarah and Cameron, John turns sixteen in the first season's last episode, placing his date of birth on November 13, 1983, a full seven months before his supposed conception. As the show's last episode takes place in 2009, this would mean John turns seventeen off-screen. In the season 2 episode Today Is the Day, Part 2, John incorrectly states he was 12 when T2 took place, contradicting the pilot episode's statement of it being 2 years since the events of T2 and John being fifteen. As the events of T2 took place in 1997 in the show's timeline, this would be consistent with his date of birth shown in the film.

The opening scene of Terminator: Dark Fate takes place 3 years after T2, in 1998. Despite John being 3 years older, he hasn't aged as much as he should have. This is likely a mistake made by the film's production team, using Edward Furlong's physical template from T2 to recreate his facial likeness from 1991.

Character

In the fictional universe's narrative, John Connor is a messianic figure (born on February 28, 1985) who will lead the Resistance to defeat an empire of robotic Terminators amassed by the rogue military AI Skynet, following a cybernetic revolt doomsday event known as Judgment Day. When his mother Sarah Connor was the target of a time travelling Terminator unit (Model 101) in the first film, John sent resistance fighter Kyle Reese to protect Sarah, knowing Kyle and Sarah would later conceive him. With foreknowledge from his parents, John fends off Terminator assassination attempts in the second and third films before Judgment Day. In the fourth film, John fights with the Resistance in a post-apocalyptic setting after Skynet has taken over.

As the series' central plot heavily involves time travel, the story of the character is often non-linear and portrays many possible outcomes, for example Terminator 3: Rise of the Machines and television series Terminator: The Sarah Connor Chronicles continue from the ending of Terminator 2 but are depicted as taking place in alternate timelines, while Terminator Genisys (2015) revisits and changes the events of the first film. Terminator: Dark Fate also continues from the events of Terminator 2 in another alternate timeline.

The Terminator
In The Terminator, John is mentioned and is the basis of the film. The Terminator (Arnold Schwarzenegger) is attempting to kill Sarah Connor (Linda Hamilton) because the latter will be his mother, but John does not make a physical appearance. At the film's end, Sarah is shown to be pregnant with John.

Terminator 2: Judgment Day
John in his first appearance in Terminator 2: Judgment Day (a sequel to the first film) is a 10-year-old child  living with foster parents (Jenette Goldstein and Xander Berkeley) while Sarah Connor is at a prison hospital of the criminally insane. Though he is informed of his destiny of his future conflict with Skynet, young John is skeptical of his mother's claims of his fate as humanity's leader. While in an arcade with a friend, the Model 101 (Schwarzenegger), a reprogrammed android sent by John's future self; and the T-1000 (Robert Patrick) fight over him. This starts a chase sequence where the Model 101 and John try to lose the T-1000; this event validates John's mother's warning to him about Skynet.

Later that night, Sarah breaks out and he and the Model 101 go to save Sarah, and the three escape. John teaches the Model 101 how to be like a human; teaching sayings like "hasta la vista, baby!" He forms an emotional bond with the Terminator, coming to regard it as a father figure. John later helps with the destruction of Cyberdyne Systems to avert Skynet's creation by breaking into the safe with Skynet's creator, Miles Dyson, to retrieve the first Terminator's damaged arm and CPU, which Dyson was using to create new technology, unaware of what it would lead to. After Cyberdyne is destroyed and the T-1000 is melted in a steel mill, John throws the remnants of the first Terminator into the molten steel. He begs the Terminator not to destroy itself as well, despite the Terminator's warning that allowing it to continue existing creates the risk to recreate Skynet at some future date. John ultimately bids his friend farewell with a hug, and watches as the Terminator is lowered into molten steel.

John is briefly seen at the film's beginning in a flash-forward as an adult played by Michael Edwards while Dalton Abbot (Linda Hamilton's real-life son) also played the character as a toddler in a dream sequence. An alternate ending takes place in 2027, in which John is a U.S. senator and father to a daughter in a world where Skynet was never able to start its war on humanity.

Terminator 3: Rise of the Machines

John is portrayed by Nick Stahl in Terminator 3: Rise of the Machines (set 10 years after the second film). Now a young adult, John has been living off-the-grid after the second film's events, even as the original Judgment Day deadline in 1997 came to pass without incident. His mother Sarah  eventually developed leukemia and died before the events of the film. In the film, John crosses paths with Katherine "Kate" Brewster (Claire Danes), a former classmate from when he was living with his foster parents. He is attacked by a T-X Terminator (Kristanna Loken), which was sent from the future. Unlike predecessors, the T-X's objective was to terminate his future Resistance officers as secondary targets because John's location was unknown. When the T-X encounters John, the T-X changes priority to focus entirely on him and Kate. Because of this Terminator being dominant and feminine, John personally coins the T-X as "Terminatrix."

A protector T-101 (Schwarzenegger), a doppelgänger of John's previous protector, is also sent back in time to protect him, explaining that Judgment Day had only been delayed and is now only hours away. The T-101 also states being sent from the future by Kate, John’s future wife and second-in-command; John had actually been killed by that very Terminator on July 4, 2032, as Skynet believed to be the most suitable for such a mission due to John's emotional attachment to said model. John and Kate intend to halt Skynet's launching. The two mistakenly believe Skynet's core is in a facility, only to find themselves locked and protected in a secure bunker as the first nuclear assault is launched on the United States as a result of Skynet's manipulations. Skynet is pure software and has already spread to every server worldwide, making it impossible to shut down. It is via the radios in this bunker that John begins to broadcast messages to lay the groundwork to help survivors and organize the Resistance.

Terminator Salvation
John is portrayed by Christian Bale in Terminator Salvation (which is set in 2018). Now an older, battle-experienced Resistance soldier, Kate Brewster (Bryce Dallas Howard) who serves as a medic and is now pregnant with his child. Kate also assists command with her Tech-Com unit. Since Judgment Day, John has been broadcasting radio messages to both the Resistance forces and surviving refugees in an effort to maintain morale and hope. The story also features new character Marcus Wright (Sam Worthington), and the teenage Kyle Reese (Anton Yelchin). John starts as one of the many foot soldiers who make up the Resistance movement based in California.

Despite having extensive prior knowledge of the machines and Skynet's capabilities, John is largely dismissed by General Hugh Ashdown (Michael Ironside) who runs the resistance organization, considering Connor as a delusional false prophet at best and a dangerous liability to their operations at worst. Nonetheless, there are pockets of people within the Resistance who have come to believe in John's experiences and judgment based on their own first hand experiences serving with him. In addition, the Resistance's majority is gradually losing faith towards the Resistance Command due to Ashdown's ruthless and vicious tactics that cost many of his own soldiers and civilians' lives. Towards the middle of the film, John learns that Kyle has been placed in a detention center by Skynet which is aware of Kyle's future role as John's father, classifying Kyle as its primary target and John as its secondary objective even over the Resistance's current leaders and sets out to rescue Kyle, with Marcus leading him to the base. Upon arrival, John faces off with a T-800 crafted in the unit's image that he and his family have encountered previously. John is hurt during his encounter with the T-800 and receives multiple cuts to the face, mirroring the same scars seen on John's face in the opening scenes of Terminator 2: Judgment Day and Terminator 3: Rise of the Machines. Marcus helps him destroy the T-800 but John's heart is too badly damaged due to injury and Marcus offers his own to John. In addition, after the Resistance Command is caught into Skynet's trap, John's Tech-Com unit takes over the authority with no opposition. John's ending statement is that though this battle has been won, the war is far from over.

Terminator Genisys

John is portrayed by Jason Clarke in Terminator Genisys (which alters the last three films' events). Following a confrontation with a T-5000 (Matt Smith) on the war's seemingly final day just as Kyle Reese (Jai Courtney) is being sent back to save Sarah Connor (Emilia Clarke), John is forcibly transformed into the T-3000 cyborg as a result of a Skynet program to use nanites to convert living flesh into machine matter. Although all other recorded test subjects for this process were left irreversibly insane and then died during the transformation, John came through the process reasonably intact, albeit now a sociopath dedicated to ensuring Skynet's rise at humanity's cost.

Skynet then sends the T-3000 back in time to ensure its creation in the altered timeline, John now believing that the future requires man and machine to come together like he has. He travels back in time to 2014 and joins Cyberdyne Systems to help create a new version of Skynet, working with Miles Dyson and Danny Dyson to perfect development of the new Genisys system, turning Skynet into a massive digital network rather than a single computer system. Three years later, despite his superior physical strength, he was destroyed by "Pops" (Schwarzenegger), a T-800 reprogrammed and sent into the past by an unknown party to protect Sarah, when both of them were trapped inside a prototype time machine. With the machine just capable of generating the electromagnetic energy that prevented non-living tissue travelling through time without actually generating a temporal portal, Connor is ripped apart while trapped at the heart of the machine after earlier battle-damage disrupted his ability to maintain his organic shell. It is ambiguous as to whether a version of the character will exist in the altered timeline, with John himself stating that his existence is a paradox that is no longer tied to Sarah and Kyle conceiving him.

Terminator: Dark Fate

John appears briefly in Terminator: Dark Fate, which serves as a different sequel to Terminator 2: Judgment Day, portrayed by Jude Collie with CGI facial capture performed by Furlong, ignoring previous sequels without creator James Cameron's involvement. In the opening scene, set three years after the events of Judgment Day, it is revealed that even though Skynet was erased from existence with Cyberdyne's destruction, it had sent multiple Terminators back to different points in time to kill John. He and Sarah are found in Guatemala by a T-800, which then shoots John dead in front of Sarah.

Though dead and gone, John's legacy continues to play a crucial role in the story. In the following years, with its mission fulfilled, the same T-800 develops a form of conscience and takes the name "Carl". It atones for John's death by sending Sarah encrypted messages revealing the location of Skynet's future arriving Terminators, while Sarah takes it upon herself to track down and destroy them to avenge John and ensure that their technology will not be used to rebuild Skynet and John's sacrifice will not be in vain. Carl later joins the fight against the Rev-9, a Terminator built by a new A.I. known as Legion. The Rev-9 is sent from the future to kill Daniella "Dani" Ramos, who will take John's place as the future leader of the human resistance against machines. In the future, Dani tells her army, "There is no fate but what we make for ourselves," as John said to Kyle Reese before sending him back to 1984. As Carl and the Rev-9 are destroyed, Carl's final words to Sarah are "for John", therefore atoning for John's death by sacrificing itself. Like she did with John, Sarah plans to prepare Dani for the coming battles against Legion, explaining her similar role and quotes to John's in the future.

Terminator: The Sarah Connor Chronicles

Thomas Dekker portrays John Connor in the parallel universe television series Terminator: The Sarah Connor Chronicles. He is only fifteen years old at the beginning of the show, turning sixteen in the season one finale, and seventeen throughout season two. As the series progresses, John struggles with his feelings for the Terminator Cameron. John De Vito plays a young John Connor in two episodes "Queen's Gambit" and "To the Lighthouse".

Casting and production background
Dekker was cast after Lena Headey secured the role of Sarah Connor. Regarding the Terminator films, Dekker says "They are like my favorite films when I was younger. So it's very ironic that I'm getting to do this. And I know for the younger generation and for myself, John was equally important to me as Sarah was, and I know a lot of the people that I hear from really, really care about John". Dekker described his character as "a continuation of Eddie Furlong's character" but "he's in a darker, more mature place now".

The show tells the story of the Connors in an alternate timeline from Terminator 3: Rise of the Machines. It branches off from the shared back story of Terminator 2, and according to consulting producer James Middleton, it was a new "version of T3."

Premise
At the beginning of the series in 1999, John and Sarah try to settle down to normal lives after the events of the second film, but they are in fear of being captured for blowing up Cyberdyne. While at school, John is attacked by a Terminator posing as a teacher, and is protected by a reprogrammed Terminator named "Cameron". John learns that Judgment Day has not been prevented, only postponed to April 21, 2011. John does not want to run anymore and asks Sarah to stop Skynet from being created. Cameron uses time dilation technology (built by "The Engineer" from the future) to send all three of them to 2007, just before Skynet is created, so that they can stop it.

Settling down in 2007, John enrolls in Campo de Cahuenga High School under the name of John Baum, after author L. Frank Baum who wrote The Wonderful Wizard of Oz, a book that Sarah says was John's favorite when he was younger, where he is friends with his fellow students Morris and Riley Dawson. He becomes acquainted with his father's older brother, Derek Reese, who is also a resistance fighter sent back in time to help them. This version of John is shown to be a highly skilled computer hacker (a nod from Terminator 2), even being able to hack into a Terminator's CPU in order to read the information it contains, as well as easily hacking into the LAPD database. He claims that he could hack a computer system 'in (his) sleep'. He is also proficient in chess, lock-picking, self-defense, and weaponry, all of which were part of his training during his childhood.

The relationship dynamic between John and Cameron is different than with the Model 101 seen in the second film by virtue of her size/gender, with some degree of sexual tension. He also develops a relationship with Riley Dawson, a high school classmate, who, unknown to him, is also from the future and working with Jesse Flores, a resistance fighter and lover of Derek Reese. Jesse's plan was for John to become infatuated with Riley, making her a threat to John's security. This would force Cameron to kill Riley, thereby alienating John from her. Apparently, after Judgment Day, rumors abound of an unnatural relationship between the two that affects John's tactical decision making, and some are unsettled that he has appointed a Terminator as one of his lieutenants.

Video games
Terminator Salvation

John Connor appears in the video game Terminator Salvation, which is set two years before the events of the film. In 2016, John (voiced by Gideon Emery) and Blair Williams (Moon Bloodgood) are on a mission to rescue David Weston (Sean Cory Cooper), until they team up with Angie Salter (Rose McGowan) and Barnes (Common) to fight the machines.

Terminator: Resistance

John Connor appears in the video game Terminator: Resistance, which is set during the original future war depicted in the first two Terminator films. He is voiced by Eric Meyers and serves as the player character, Jacob Rivers's commanding officer within the Tech-Com Resistance group. John makes a physical appearance towards the endgame where he briefs and debriefs Jacob during the final assault on Skynet's base.

Attraction
T2-3D: Battle Across Time

Furlong reprised his role from Terminator 2 in this Universal Studios attraction, in which he and a T-800 attempt to stop Judgment Day. They travel to the future and infiltrate Cyberdyne to prevent the completion of Skynet. After fighting various machines and succeeding in their mission, John is sent back to the present.

Literature
T2 trilogy
The T2 novel trilogy explores Sarah and John's life while living off-the-grid. The first novel, T2: Infiltrator, is set six years after the events of Terminator 2: Judgment Day. It sees Sarah and 16-year-old John live a relatively normal life under the assumed names Suzanne and John Krieger, near a small town in Paraguay. They own a successful trucking company and are proficient smugglers. John also attends military school, quickly becoming one of their best students, gaining military skills, weaponry and hacking knowledge. The Connors believed that they had destroyed Cyberdyne Systems for good and prevented the creation of Skynet, until a new T-800 is sent to kill them. To stop Skynet's creation, the Connors team up with their new neighbor Dieter von Rossbach, a former Austrian counterterrorism operative and future model for the T-800 series. They also join forces with FBI agent Jordan Dyson, the brother of Miles Dyson. The group destroys Cyberdyne's most recent facility and the remaining Terminators, although Sarah is wounded by a new Terminator model, the i-950 Infiltrator, who had sent the T-800.

The following novel, T2: Rising Storm, shows John and Dieter starting up the foundations of the future Resistance a few months after the events of the previous novel. Dieter has been chosen as John's guardian by Sarah while she recovers from her wounds. Dieter, John, and John's new girlfriend, Wendy Dorset, head to a Cyberdyne back-up facility in Montana but they fail to stop Skynet from becoming sentient. Wendy is killed by an i-950, and Skynet begins eradicating humanity after John accidentally uploads a command protocol to make Skynet sentient (Wendy had completed a program to erase Skynet before her death but John uploaded the wrong file at the last minute).

In the final novel, T2: The Future War, Skynet has killed three billion people and John has become the leader of the Resistance, with Sarah and Dieter having fallen in love and married. The life between the parents of John's eventual father Kyle Reese is explored, with Kyle being born, being captured by a patrol unit as a child and forced to work in a Skynet work camp. The work camp is liberated by John and his Tech-Com unit, freeing Kyle and the other prisoners, while Kyle's parents are killed. John assigns his friend Jack Brock to protect Kyle, as well as becoming his foster father. Kyle grows up fighting alongside John and his Tech-Com unit. In 2029, as the Resistance is about to destroy Skynet's defence grid, Skynet makes a last effort to win the war by sending several Terminators back in time to kill the Connors. Once John finds out about this, he sends the volunteering Kyle back to protect Sarah from the T-800 and a reprogrammed T-800 to protect his younger self from the T-1000. Afterwards, Skynet is effectively destroyed and John is greeted by Sarah, Dieter and the remaining Resistance members as they are relieved that the great ordeal is finally over.

Comic books

John Connor appears in the non-canon Terminator/Superman comic book crossover Superman vs. The Terminator: Death to the Future'', in which he and Sarah Connor team up with Superman against Skynet and The Cyborg.

Family tree

Notes

References

Action film characters
Characters created by James Cameron
Child characters in film
Fictional aviators
Fictional characters from Los Angeles
Fictional characters with post-traumatic stress disorder
Fictional commanders
Fictional generals
Fictional hackers
Fictional homeless people
Fictional Irish American people
Fictional machine hunters
Fictional murdered people
Fictional lieutenants
Fictional people from the 20th-century
Fictional revolutionaries
Fictional soldiers
Fictional United States Marine Corps personnel
Fictional United States senators
Fictional war veterans
Film characters introduced in 1991
Terminator (franchise) characters
Time travelers